Cypher is the third album by the experimental black metal band Spektr.

Track listing
Hermetism - 1:22
Teratology - 9:39
The Singularity - 8:14
Solitude - 1:40
Antimatter - 6:09
Solve et Coagula - 2:42
Cypher - 11:15
Decorporation - 1:15
Le Vitriol du Philosophe - 3:35

Musicians
kl.K. (aka Krig) - drums, vocals, samples, programming
Hth - guitars, bass, vocals, samples, programming

References

2013 albums
Spektr (band) albums